Raigadh Road railway station is a small railway station in Sabarkantha district, Gujarat. Its code is RGQ. It serves Raigadh village. The station consists of two platforms, which are not well sheltered. It lacks many facilities including water and sanitation.

Raigadh Road railway station is part of the Ahmedabad–Udaipur line. It is undergoing gauge conversion, from metre to broad gauge. In May 2019 the section between Himmatnagar and Raigadh stations was commissioned (24 km) and in January 2020, Udaipur –  section (24 km), remaining under gauge conversion Raigadh–Kharwa Chanda (163 km).

References 

Ajmer railway division
Railway stations in Sabarkantha district